William Ashurst (1607–1656) of Ashurst's Hall, Dalton, Lancashire was an English politician who sat in the House of Commons at various times between 1649 and 1654. He fought in the Parliamentarian army in the English Civil War. 

Ashurst was the son of Henry Ashurst of Ashurst's Hall, where his ancestors were seated after the Norman conquest. His brothers included Henry Ashurst, a successful London merchant and John Ashurst, a Parliamentarian lieutenant-colonel and Governor of Liverpool.

In November 1640, Ashurst was elected Member of Parliament for Newton in the Long Parliament. He was a major in the parliamentary army and a zealous puritan. In 1654 he was elected MP for Lancashire in the First Protectorate Parliament.

He married Dorothy Ellis and had a son Thomas.

References

 

1607 births
1656 deaths
Roundheads
English MPs 1640–1648
English MPs 1648–1653
English MPs 1654–1655
Members of the Parliament of England (pre-1707) for Lancashire